James Wilkinson (30 November 1854 – 11 January 1915) was an Australian politician.

Wilkinson was born and raised in Ipswich, Queensland, attending both state and grammar schools. During his early years he was an engine-driver and railways unionist before serving as an Alderman on Ipswich Council.

Wilkinson represented the Electoral district of Ipswich in the Legislative Assembly of Queensland from 1894 to 1896 for the Australian Labor Party.  He was elected for the seat of Moreton in the Parliament of Australia in 1901, as an Independent Labour member, but rejoined the Labor Party in 1903.

Wilkinson died in 1915. His funeral took place from his Martin Street residence in Ipswich and he was buried in the Ipswich General Cemetery.

Street name
A number of street names in the Brisbane suburb of Carina Heights are identical to the surnames of former Members of the Queensland Legislative Assembly. One of these is Wilkinson Street.

References

1854 births
1915 deaths
Members of the Australian House of Representatives
Members of the Australian House of Representatives for Moreton
Members of the Queensland Legislative Assembly
Australian Labor Party members of the Parliament of Australia
Independent members of the Parliament of Australia
People from Ipswich, Queensland
Burials at Ipswich General Cemetery
20th-century Australian politicians
Train drivers